Viridiana is a 1961 Spanish-Mexican film directed by Luis Buñuel and produced by Gustavo Alatriste. It is loosely based on the 1895 novel Halma by Benito Pérez Galdós.

The film was the co-winner of the Palme d'Or at the 1961 Cannes Film Festival. In a 2016 poll of 350 experts organized by Spanish film magazine Caimán Cuadernos de Cine, it was voted the best Spanish film of all time, with 227 votes.

Plot
A novice nun named Viridiana is about to take her vows when her uncle Jaime invites her to visit him. She has only met him once and does not want to go, but her mother superior reminds Viridiana that Jaime is her only living relative and paid for her studies, so she agrees to make the trip.

Jaime is a widower and recluse who lives on a neglected country estate with a few servants. He greets Viridiana, who strongly resembles her aunt, warmly and says he is sorry he does not know her better. Viridiana likes life on the farm, but remains cold toward Jaime, as she heard he has an illegitimate son who he abandoned.

On the last day of her visit, Jaime asks Viridiana to don his wife's wedding gown. She does, and Jaime tells her that her aunt died of a heart attack on their wedding night. It becomes clear that Jaime wants to marry Viridiana, and she is repulsed. He seems to drop the idea and gets her to agree to stay for a cup of coffee before going to bed, signaling his maid Ramona to drug Viridiana's drink. Jaime kisses her once she is unconscious, but cannot bring himself to rape her.

In the morning, Jaime tells Viridiana that, because he raped her, she cannot return to the convent. She still packs her things, so he admits what really happened, hoping she will not leave hating him, but Viridiana does not forgive Jaime.

Viridiana is kept from boarding the bus out of town by the news that Jaime hanged himself. She feels guilty for his death and decides to stay on at the estate. Jaime split his belongings between Viridiana and his son, Jorge, who moves into Jaime's house with his girlfriend, Lucía, and begins to fix up the buildings and land he inherited. Meanwhile, Viridiana pays beggars from town to move onto the property, where she cares for them and devotes herself to their moral development. She even welcomes José, a man with sores on his arm, who the other beggars do not accept, as they think he has leprosy. The beggars behave themselves when Viridiana is around, but they revert to their old ways as soon as she is gone.

Jorge says he does not like Viridiana's actions and is annoyed by her piety, but Lucía thinks he is attracted to her and, also bored of the country, leaves. After noticing Ramona looking at him, Jorge seduces the maid.

When Viridiana and Jorge go to town on business and all of the servants are also away, the beggars break into Jorge's house. At first, they just want to look around, but they wind up having a drunken dinner party. Enedina has everyone pose on one side of the table, like in Da Vinci's The Last Supper, but she does not really have a camera. Everyone laughs, and José puts Handel's "Hallelujah" Chorus on the turntable and dances around in Jaime's wife's bridal veil and corset. Paco pulls Enedina behind a couch and begins to rape her, but, in their inebriated state, the others think the interaction is consensual. When Amalio, a blind man who is Enedina's jealous boyfriend, hears about what is happening, he says he will kill Paco and breaks all of the dishes on the table.

As there is now irreparable damage, most of the beggars flee the estate. They run into Jorge on their way out, and he surveys the destruction until "El Cojo" attacks him. José knocks Jorge out and Viridiana enters. El Cojo tries to rape her while José, who hopes to get "a turn", ties up Jorge. When Jorge awakens, he bribes José to kill El Cojo, saving Viridinia, who has fainted. Ramona returns with some police officers.

Viridiana lets her hair down and puts her crown of thorns, which she used to kneel in front of during her prayers, on a pile of waste to be burned. She goes to Jorge's bedroom and finds Ramona with him. He invites her to play cards and listen to some modern music, and, though she appears troubled, she complies. Jorge has both women sit down and deals the cards.

Censored ending
The Spanish board of censors rejected the original ending of the film, which depicted Viridiana entering Jorge's room and slowly closing the door behind her. A new ending was written and accepted that, according to some film historians, is even more debauched, if less explicit, than the first, as it implies a ménage à trois consisting of Jorge, Ramona, and Viridiana. The released version of the film ends with Jorge saying: "You know, the first time I saw you, I thought, 'My cousin and I will end up shuffling the deck together.'"

Cast

 Silvia Pinal as Viridiana
 Francisco Rabal as Jorge, Don Jaime's illegitimate son
 Fernando Rey as Don Jaime, the widow of Viridiana's aunt
 Margarita Lozano as Ramona, Don Jaime's maid
 Victoria Zinny as Lucía, Jorge's girlfriend
 Teresita Rabal as Rita, Ramona's young daughter
 Rosita Yarza as the mother superior at Viridiana's convent (uncredited)
 Francisco René as Moncho, the caretaker at Don Jaime's estate (uncredited)
 Alfonso Cordón as Ramón, the foreman of the crew Jorge hires to fix up the estate (uncredited)
 Manuel Alexandre as the peasant from whom Jorge buys a dog (uncredited)
 José María Lado as the mayor (uncredited)

The Beggars
 José Calvo as Don Amalio, who is blind
 José Manuel Martín as "El Cojo" ("The Lame"), who has a bandaged foot and paints
 Luis Heredia as Manuel "El Poca" ("The Little"), an elderly man who is short and thin
 Joaquín Roa as Don Zequiel, a short, elderly man with a white beard
 Lola Gaos as Enedina, who has two small daughters and cooks
 María Isbert (credited as Maruja Isbert) as a woman who plays the guitar
 Juan García Tiendra as José "El Leproso" ("The Leper"), who has sores on his left forearm (uncredited)
 Milagros Tomás as Refugio, who is pregnant (uncredited)
 Joaquin Mayol as Paco, who used to weave (uncredited)
 Palmira Guerra as "La Jardinera" ("The Gardener"), who gardens (uncredited)
 Alicia Jorge Barriga as "La Erona", who is a little person (uncredited)
 Sergio Mendizábal as "El Pelón" ("The Bald"), who walks with a crutch and chooses not to come to the estate (uncredited)

Reception
While Viridiana is regarded by many modern critics as a masterpiece, its initial reception was not so uniformly positive. It was sent by the Spanish cinematographic authority to the Cannes Film Festival, where it won the Palme d'Or, but then L'Osservatore Romano, the official newspaper of the Vatican, described the film as "blasphemous", and the government of Francisco Franco banned its release in Spain. According to executive producer Pere Portabella, Spanish authorities tried to have the original negative burned, and it only survived because it was with a foreign company who had done some post-production work. The film was not released in Spain until 1977, two years after Franco's death, when Buñuel was 77 years old. For his part, Buñuel said he "didn't deliberately set out to be blasphemous, but then Pope John XXIII is a better judge of such things than I am".

The film won the Belgian Film Critics Association's Grand Prix, but Bosley Crowther of The New York Times wrote:

In 2012, Viridiana was voted the 37th greatest film of all time in the British Film Institute's Sight & Sound directors' poll; it placed 110th in the critics' poll.

Home video
The film  was released by The Criterion Collection in the United States and by Madman Entertainment in Australia (on the "Directors Suite" label) and New Zealand.

Notes

References

External links
 Silvia Pinal, Pere Portabella, Juan Luis Buñuel and Jean-Claude Carrière speak about the film at  35 mm de cine español
 
 
 Viridiana: The Human Comedy an essay by Michael Wood at the Criterion Collection
 

1961 comedy-drama films
1961 films
Censored films
Censorship in Spain
Films based on Spanish novels
Films based on works by Benito Pérez Galdós
Films directed by Luis Buñuel
Films set in Spain
Films shot in Madrid
Mexican black-and-white films
Palme d'Or winners
Film controversies in Spain
Religious controversies in film
Spanish black comedy films
Spanish black-and-white films
1960s Spanish-language films
1960s Spanish films
1960s Mexican films